Always August was an American psychedelic rock band from Richmond, Virginia signed with Greg Ginn's original label, SST Records.  They released three albums on SST. Their first record, Black Pyramid, was released in 1986.

The band was made up of John Kiefer (guitar, vocals, kalimba, percussion), Jeff Douglas (drums, xylophone, vocals, percussion), Lee West (guitar, vocals, panpipes, percussion), and Tim Harding (bass, vocals, shakuhachi, flute, percussion).

Discography 
 Black Pyramid (1986)
 Largeness With (W)holes (1987)
 Geography (1988)

American psychedelic rock music groups
Rock music groups from Virginia